Dajti Castle is a  archaeological site in Albania, comprising the ruins of a Roman fortification and several dwellings. It belongs to late antiquity, probably having been built over Illyrian foundations. It lies at  altitude on top of a hill, west-side of Mount Dajti, close to Tirana. It was discovered in 1963 and eventually was inscribed in the list of the Cultural Monuments of Albania. In 2008 a three-year restoration project began, aiming to conduct further archaeological searching and surveys and to improve the nearby infrastructure for visitors and tourists.

History
According to the archaeological material, construction and the analysis carried on site, the castle of Dajti is thought to date back to the late antiquity in the 6th century. Procopius of Caesarea in his panegyric work Buildings of Justinian writes that the East Roman (Byzantine) Emperor Justinian I (r. 527–565) "...built 32 castles and reconstructed 26 others in Epirus Nova, in order to protect it from the Slavic attacks". He also mentioned the castle Tirkan, the probable origin of Albania capital's name Tirana, dating back to 1st century BC and lying on Dajti's mountainside, which might be Tujani Castle, on a much lower altitude than Dajti castle.

The castle was discovered in 1963 by the historian and archaeologist Neritan Ceka. Soon afterwards it was declared a Culture Monument of 1st category on January 15, 1963, by the Rectorate of the State University (today University of Tirana).

Location
The ruins of the castle and of the dwellings beside it lie on the top of a hill formation with a saddle like form on the western side of Mount Dajti (highest peak ). At the end there is the climbing of the slopy part within the forest.

The port city of Durrës and the Adriatic sea can be clearly seen. From this strategic position a very wide range of territory from northwest to south could be observed.

Architecture
From the walls' analysis, two main construction phases can be ascertained. The first phase, a typical dry stone method, is realized with large quadrangular stone blocks, bound together without any mortar, suggesting of an earlier Illyrian castle. The other phase of the walls is done through unworked smaller stones bound with mortar and belongs to the later Roman period.
A transverse wall divides the northern part of the fortification, thus creating a small acropolis like structure.
The main architectural elements of the fortification are its towers, located in each of the vertices of the triangle.

Archaeological material
The most important findings on the site were several coins of the Byzantine emperor Tiberius II Constantine (r. 578–582). Interesting is an  iron tool in the form of a knife. Inside the castle and on the flat terraces several ceramic fragments were found. They were of an almost pure clay, well-baked but without any paint. The found ceramics were mostly parts of typical Roman roof tiles and fewer pottery objects and everyday vessels. The most distinctive ceramic is a tile fragment with figures stamped on it, resembling the Illyrian decorative motifs. Slag from the process of ore smelting has also been found, suggesting that the locals were familiar with this process. Mount Dajt is rich in bauxite and still today there is a bauxite mine near the site. A vessel with flutings and the remains of a profiled loom are evidences of the introduced Roman culture in the site.

Restoration project
Forty-five years after its discovery and inscription in the Albanian Culture Monuments list, in 2008 the Culture Monuments Institute’s archaeologists Spiro Nika and Suela Xhyheri prepared a restoration project for Dajti castle. The project was approved and started the implementation phase under the coordinator, Prof.Dr Skënder Muçaj, from the Institute of Archaeology. The Institute of Culture Monuments, Regional Directory of Culture Monuments, the Institute of Archaeology, Dajti commune and Dajti National Park were cooperators within this project.

See also
Roman military engineering

References

Buildings and structures completed in the 6th century
Castles in Albania
Byzantine forts
Buildings and structures in Tirana
Buildings of Justinian I
Illyrian architecture
Roman fortifications in Macedonia
6th-century fortifications